Everything Everywhere All at Once is a 2022 American absurdist comedy-drama film written and directed by Daniel Kwan and Daniel Scheinert (collectively known as "Daniels"), who produced it with Anthony and Joe Russo and Jonathan Wang. It follows Evelyn Wang, a Chinese-American immigrant who, while being audited by the IRS, must connect with parallel universe versions of herself to prevent a powerful being from destroying the multiverse. Michelle Yeoh stars as Evelyn, with Stephanie Hsu, Ke Huy Quan, Jenny Slate, Harry Shum Jr., James Hong, and Jamie Lee Curtis in supporting roles.

Kwan and Scheinert began work on the project in 2010, and its production was announced in 2018. Principal photography ran from January to March 2020. The soundtrack features compositions by Son Lux, including collaborations with Mitski, David Byrne, André 3000, John Hampson, and Randy Newman.  

Everything Everywhere All at Once premiered at South by Southwest on March 11, 2022, and began a limited theatrical release in the United States on March 25, 2022, before a wide release by A24 on April 8. The film was universally acclaimed for its originality, screenplay, direction, acting (particularly of Yeoh, Hsu, Quan, and Curtis), visual effects, costume design, action sequences, musical score, and editing. Its portrayal of philosophical concepts such as existentialism, nihilism, and absurdism, as well as its approach to themes such as neurodivergence, depression, generational trauma, and Asian-American identity, have been widely analyzed. The New York Times called the film a "swirl of genre anarchy" with elements of surreal comedy, science fiction, fantasy, martial arts films, and animation. It grossed $112 million worldwide, becoming A24's first film to cross the $100 million mark and surpassing Hereditary (2018) as its highest-grossing film.

Everything Everywhere All at Once is the most awarded film of all time. It received a leading eleven nominations at the 95th Academy Awards, and won a leading seven awards: Best Picture, Best Director, Best Actress (Yeoh), Best Supporting Actor (Quan), Best Supporting Actress (Curtis), Best Original Screenplay, and Best Film Editing. It also won two Golden Globe Awards, five Critics' Choice Awards (including Best Picture), one BAFTA Award, a record four SAG Awards (including Best Ensemble), a record seven Independent Spirit Awards (including Best Feature), and swept the four major guild awards (DGA, PGA, SAG, and WGA).

Plot

Evelyn Quan Wang is a middle-aged Chinese American immigrant who runs a laundromat with her husband, Waymond. Two decades previously, they eloped to the United States and had a daughter, Joy. The laundromat is being audited by the Internal Revenue Service (IRS). Waymond is trying to serve Evelyn divorce papers, and Evelyn's demanding father (referred to as Gong Gong, Cantonese for 'grandfather'), is visiting for her Chinese New Year party. Evelyn, reluctant to accept Joy's lesbian relationship with her non-Chinese girlfriend Becky, introduces Becky to Gong Gong as Joy's "very good friend."

At a tense meeting with IRS inspector Deirdre Beaubeirdre, Waymond's body is taken over by Alpha-Waymond, a version of Waymond from the "Alphaverse." Alpha-Waymond explains to Evelyn that many parallel universes exist because every life choice creates a new alternative universe. The Alphaverse, led by the late Alpha-Evelyn, developed "verse-jumping" technology, which enables people to access the skills, memories, and bodies of their parallel-universe selves by performing bizarre actions that are statistically unlikely. The multiverse is threatened by Jobu Tupaki, the Alphaverse version of Joy, whose mind was splintered after Alpha-Evelyn pushed her to extensively verse-jump. Jobu experiences all universes at once and can verse-jump and manipulate matter at will. She has created a black hole-like "everything bagel" topped with everything, which appears as a toroid singularity that could destroy the multiverse.

Evelyn is given verse-jumping technology to fight Jobu's minions, who converge on the IRS building. She discovers other universes in which she made different choices and flourished, such as becoming a kung fu master and film star. She also learns of Waymond's plans for divorce. Alpha-Waymond believes that Evelyn, as the greatest "failure" of all Evelyns in the multiverse, has the untapped potential to defeat Jobu. Gong Gong is taken over by Alpha-Gong Gong, who instructs Evelyn to kill Joy to stop Jobu from using her to enter Evelyn's universe. Evelyn refuses and decides to face Jobu by gaining powers through repeated verse-jumping. Alpha-Gong Gong, convinced that Evelyn's mind has been compromised like Jobu's, sends soldiers after Evelyn. While they fight, Jobu locates and kills Alpha-Waymond in the Alphaverse. As Jobu confronts Evelyn in her universe, Evelyn's mind splinters, and she collapses.

Evelyn's consciousness uncontrollably verse-jumps alongside Jobu's across bizarre and diverse universes. Jobu reveals she doesn't want to fight, but that instead, she has been searching for an Evelyn who can see, as she does, that nothing matters while killing the Evelyns that don't see as she does. She brings Evelyn to the everything bagel, explaining that she wants to use it to allow herself and Evelyn to truly die. Upon looking into the bagel, Evelyn is persuaded and acts nihilistically in her other universes, hurting those around her.

As Evelyn is about to enter the bagel with Jobu, she pauses to listen to Waymond's pleas in her universe for everybody to stop fighting and to instead be kind even when life doesn't make sense. Evelyn has an existentialist epiphany and decides to follow Waymond's absurdist and humanist advice, using her multiverse powers to find what hurts those around her and brings them happiness. In doing so, she repairs her damage in the other universes and neutralizes Alpha-Gong Gong and Jobu's fighters. In her home universe, Evelyn reconciles with Waymond, tells Gong Gong of Joy and Becky's relationship, and talks with Deirdre after Waymond convinces Deirdre to let them redo their taxes. Jobu decides to enter the bagel alone while, simultaneously in Evelyn's universe, Joy begs Evelyn to let her go. Evelyn tells Joy that even when nothing makes sense and even though she could be anywhere else in the multiverse, she would always want to be with Joy. Evelyn and the others save Jobu from the bagel, and Evelyn and Joy embrace.

Some time later, with the family's relationships improved, they return to the IRS building to refile their taxes. As Deirdre talks, Evelyn's attention is momentarily drawn to her alternative selves and the multiverse before she grounds herself back in her home universe.

Cast

 Michelle Yeoh as Evelyn Quan Wang, a dissatisfied and overwhelmed laundromat owner; and as several other versions of Evelyn in alternate universes.
 Stephanie Hsu as Joy Wang, Evelyn's daughter; and Jobu Tupaki, Alpha-Evelyn's omnicidal daughter whose growing nihilism is a threat to the entire multiverse.
 Ke Huy Quan as Waymond Wang, Evelyn's meek and goofy husband whose existentialism is the antidote to Jobu's nihilism; and as Alpha-Waymond, from the Alphaverse; and other versions of Waymond in alternate universes
 James Hong as Gong Gong (Cantonese for 'grandfather'), Evelyn's demanding father; and Alpha-Gong Gong, Alpha-Evelyn's father in the Alphaverse who wants Evelyn to sacrifice Joy to impede Jobu.
 Jamie Lee Curtis as Deirdre Beaubeirdre, an IRS inspector; and as several other versions of Deirdre in alternate universes.
 Jenny Slate as Debbie the Dog Mom, a laundromat customer. Her original name of Big Nose was changed for the film's digital release because of its association with Jewish stereotypes.
 Harry Shum Jr. as Chad, a teppanyaki chef working alongside an alternative Evelyn in another universe.

Tallie Medel appears as Becky Sregor, Joy's girlfriend; Biff Wiff appears as Rick, a laundromat customer; Sunita Mani and Aaron Lazar appear as actors in a musical film Evelyn watches; Audrey Wasilewski and Peter Banifaz appear as Alpha RV Officers; Andy Le and Brian Le appear as Alpha Trophy Jumpers; and Michiko Nishiwaki appears as Evelyn's kung-fu opponent and costar.

Randy Newman, who has scored nine Disney–Pixar films, appears as the voice of Raccacoonie, a reference to the Pixar-animated film Ratatouille (2007); he is credited as a featured artist on the track "Now We're Cookin. Cameos include Scheinert as District Manager, and Kwan uncredited as a man sucked into the bagel and as a mugger.

Production

Development

Co-directors Daniel Kwan and Daniel Scheinert, known as the Daniels, began researching the concept of the multiverse as early as 2010, after being exposed to the concept of modal realism in the Ross McElwee documentary Sherman's March (1986). Kwan described the release of the animated film Spider-Man: Into the Spider-Verse (2018), which also deals with a multiversal concept, as "a little upsetting because we were like, 'Oh shit, everyone's going to beat us to this thing we've been working on. He also stated "Watching the second season of Rick and Morty was really painful. I was like, 'They've already done all the ideas we thought were original!' It was a really frustrating experience. So I stopped watching Rick and Morty while we were writing this project."

In early drafts of the screenplay, the directors planned for the main character to be a professor and have undiagnosed attention deficit hyperactivity disorder (ADHD); through his research for the project, Kwan learned that he had undiagnosed ADHD.

Scenes in which Evelyn trains in martial arts and becomes an action film star were visually and contextually inspired by the films of Wong Kar-wai. Chris Lee of Vulture writes that they "conjur[e] a mood of exquisite romantic yearning that will be instantly recognizable ... as touchstones" of Wong's works. The universe in which Evelyn and Joy are rocks was influenced by the children's book Sylvester and the Magic Pebble (1969) and the video game Everything (2017).

Kwan has said the idea of the everything bagel "started as just a throwaway joke", a play on a type of American bagel called an "everything bagel", which is baked with a large variety of toppings. Scheinert said they spent time attempting to develop the religion of bagel followers, but encountered complications: "[Jobu Tupaki]'s a nihilist; should there be dogma? Should there be a book? What should their practices be as a religion? The bagel stuck because it became such a useful, simple symbol that we could point to as filmmakers. And you don't have to explain it much beyond the joke."

Casting

The script was written for Jackie Chan until Kwan and Scheinert reconceived the protagonist as a woman, feeling it would make the husband–wife dynamic in the story more relatable.

The new script's lead character was initially named Michelle Wang, according to Michelle Yeoh, who said, "If you ask the Daniels, when they started on this draft, they focused on, 'Well, we are doing this for Michelle Yeoh. The character's name was eventually changed to Evelyn. With her resemblance to the version of Evelyn as a martial artist and film star, Yeoh opposed naming the character Michelle. "Evelyn deserves her own story to be told. This is a very ordinary mother [and] housewife who is trying her best to be a good mother to her daughter, a good daughter to her father, a wife that's trying to keep the family together [...] I don't like to integrate me, Michelle Yeoh, into the characters that I play, because they all deserve their own journey and their stories to be told."

It was announced in August 2018 that Yeoh and Awkwafina had been cast to star in what was described as an "interdimensional action film" from Kwan and Scheinert, with Anthony and Joe Russo attached to produce. Awkwafina left the project in January 2020 due to scheduling conflicts, and was replaced with Stephanie Hsu. James Hong, Ke Huy Quan, and Jamie Lee Curtis joined the cast. It marked Quan's return to film acting, from which he had retired in 2002 due to a lack of casting opportunities. Kwan and Scheinert were inspired to cast Quan after seeing a meme of politician Andrew Yang being shown as a grown-up version of Short Round, Quan's character from Indiana Jones and the Temple of Doom (1984). They were curious to learn what Quan had been doing, and learned that he was the right age to portray Waymond. Coincidentally, Quan had returned to acting soon before he was approached for the role. Quan's former The Goonies (1985) co-star Jeff Cohen was his attorney to negotiate his contract.

Filming
Principal photography began in January 2020, with A24 announcing that it would finance and distribute the film. Shooting took 38 days, mostly in Simi Valley, California. Much of the film was shot overcranked at a very high frame rate to accommodate extensive time remapping in post production. The Daniels said the kung-fu fight scenes were shot unusually quickly; for example, the fanny-pack fight was shot in a day and a half. Filming wrapped in early March 2020, during the onset of the COVID-19 pandemic in the United States. The first cut ran around 170 minutes.

Visual effects
Visual effects post-production for the film was done in-house, after the Daniels' negative experience with a dedicated post-production studio for their previous film Swiss Army Man. Instead, the filmmakers assembled a small team of five artists, who produced all visual effects using Adobe After Effects, and used Resilio Sync to share the large amounts of data once the pandemic hit.

For Dierdre's appearance, Kwan discovered a picture of a real IRS agent he found online, which Curtis liked and wanted to emulate. Curtis wanted the character to be as "real" as possible and used her real belly for the film, as opposed to a prosthetic.

Themes
Everything Everywhere All at Once incorporates elements from a number of genres and film mediums, including absurdist comedy, science fiction, fantasy, martial arts films, and animation. A. O. Scott of The New York Times described the film as a "swirl of genre anarchy", explaining that "while the hectic action sequences and flights of science-fiction mumbo-jumbo are a big part of the fun (and the marketing), they aren't really the point. [It is] a bittersweet domestic drama, a marital comedy, a story of immigrant striving and a hurt-filled ballad of mother-daughter love." Laura Zornosa from The New York Times elaborates its addressing of intergenerational trauma through healing relationships. Additionally, Emily St. James wrote on Vox that the film is part of a rising subgenre of "millennial parental apology fantasy", imagining worlds in which parents and children reconcile.

The film explores the meaning of life and various associated philosophies, particularly the opposites of existentialism and of nihilism. According to Charles Bramesco of The Guardian, "The bagel of doom and its tightening grip on Evelyn's daughter lend themselves to the climactic declaration that there's nothing worse than submitting to the nihilism so trendy with the next generation. Our lone hope of recourse is to embrace all the love and beauty surrounding us, if only we're present enough to see it." This nihilism is also incorporated into the film's exploration of Asian American identity. Anne Anlin Cheng wrote in The Washington Post, "It's not only that the multiverse acts as a metaphor for the immigrant Asian American experience, or a convenient parable for the dislocations and personality splits suffered by hyphenated (that is, 'Asian-American') citizens. It also becomes a rather heady vehicle for confronting and negotiating Asian-pessimism", a term she uses in reference to Afro-pessimism.

Consequences Clint Worthington wrote that "for all its dadaist absurdism and  pace, Daniels weaves the chaotic possibilities into the multiverse into a cohesive story about the aches and pains of the road not traveled, and the need to carve out your own meaning in a meaningless universe." Describing Jobu Tupaki's modus operandi, Worthington notes "the living contradiction that is the everything bagel: if you put everything on a bagel, what more is left? And if you've experienced everything that the multiverse can offer, what's the point of any of it?" Kwan said that the everything bagel concept "did two things. It allowed us to talk about nihilism without being too eye roll-y. And it creates a MacGuffin: a doomsday device. If, in the first half of the movie, people think that the bagel is here to destroy the world, and in the second half you realize it's a depressed person trying to destroy themselves, it just takes everything about action movies and turns it into something more personal."

The film engages textually and metatextually with the "real world" of the viewer. Critics have noted that one version of Evelyn—a famous martial arts movie star—is a portrayal of Yeoh, that Ke Huy Quan's experience as a stunt coordinator is used diegetically in Waymond's fight scenes, and that James Hong's transformation into "a more sinister, English-fluent, Machiavellian strategist" parallels his character Lo Pan in Big Trouble in Little China (1986).

Music

The musical score was composed by Son Lux, whose members are Ryan Lott, Ian Chang, and Rafiq Bhatia. Daniels asked them to approach the score individually, and not as a band. Lott said, "I think that the complete picture of not only who we are as a band, but also who we are as individuals and what we have accomplished and the places we've gone creatively individually, meant for them that there was a possibility that many of these universes of sound could be within reach with this particular trio."

Son Lux took two to three years to compose the score, which includes more than a hundred musical cues. The soundtrack album consists of 49 tracks and runs for more than two hours. It features several prominent musicians, including Mitski, David Byrne, a flute-playing André 3000, Randy Newman, Moses Sumney, Hajnal Pivnick, and yMusic. Two songs—"This Is a Life" featuring Mitski and Byrne and "Fence" featuring Sumney—were released as singles on March 4 and 14, 2022. The album was released on March 25 to positive critical response.

The film features several instances, both in audio and in dialogue, of the 2000 Nine Days song "Absolutely (Story of a Girl)". When Daniels contacted Nine Days vocalist John Hampson about using the song, Hampson enthusiastically agreed to record three alternate versions of the song for use in the film.

Release

Theatrical
The world premiere was at the South by Southwest film festival on March 11, 2022. Its limited release in theaters was on March 25, 2022, and its nationwide release was on April 8, in the United States by A24. On March 30, 2022, the film was released in select IMAX theaters in the U.S. for one night only. Due to its popularity, the film returned to select IMAX theaters for one week starting on April 29, 2022. The film was not released in most parts of the Middle East, including Saudi Arabia and Kuwait, due to censorship of LGBT issues in those countries. The film was released in the United Kingdom on May 13, 2022. The film was re-released in U.S. theaters on July 29, 2022, unchanged but adding an introduction by Daniels and eight minutes of outtakes after the credits. It was re-released again in U.S. theaters on January 27, 2023, on 1,400 screens to celebrate its Oscar nominations.

Home media
The film was released on digital streaming platforms on June 7, 2022, and was released on Blu-ray, DVD, and Ultra HD Blu-ray on July 5, 2022, by Lionsgate Home Entertainment.

Reception

Box office
, Everything Everywhere All at Once has grossed $75.6 million in the United States and Canada and $37.1 million in other territories, for a worldwide total of $112.7 million.

In the United States and Canada, the film earned $509,600 from ten venues in its opening weekend. Its debut had a theater average of $50,965, the second-best since the beginning of the COVID-19 pandemic for a platform release (behind Licorice Pizza) and the then-best opening theater average in 2022. In its second weekend, the film grossed $1.1 million from 38 theaters, finishing ninth at the box office. It received a wide expansion in its third weekend, going from 38 to 1,250 theaters. It made $6.1 million, finishing sixth at the box office. Playing in 2,220 theaters the following weekend, it earned $6.2 million, finishing fourth. In its sixth weekend, it added $5.5 million, part of which was attributed to a wider IMAX release following its successful box office run until then. It added $3.5 million in its seventh weekend, and another $3.3 million in its eighth. By May 21, it had made over $51 million, surpassing Uncut Gems ($50 million) as A24's highest-grossing film domestically. By June 9, it had made over $80 million, surpassing Hereditary ($79 million) as A24's highest-grossing film of all time. It remained in the box office top ten until its sixteenth weekend, which ended on July 10. The film crossed the $100 million mark worldwide on July 31, making it the first independent film released during the pandemic (and in A24's history) to achieve this distinction.

Outside of the United States, other top-earning territories as of July 31 were the United Kingdom ($6.2 million), Canada ($5.1 million), Australia ($4.5 million), Russia ($2.4 million), Taiwan ($2.3 million), Mexico ($2 million), Hong Kong ($1.7 million), Germany ($1.5 million), and the Netherlands ($1.1 million).

Critical response

On the review aggregator website Rotten Tomatoes, the film has an approval rating of 94% based on 386 reviews, with an average rating of 8.6/10. The website's consensus reads, "Led by an outstanding Michelle Yeoh, Everything Everywhere All at Once lives up to its title with an expertly calibrated assault on the senses." On August 26, 2022, Rotten Tomatoes users voted Everything Everywhere All at Once as "A24's Best Film of All Time" in their A24 Showdown. Metacritic, which uses a weighted average, assigned the film a score of 81 out of 100, based on 54 critics, indicating "universal acclaim". Audiences polled by PostTrak gave it an 89% positive score, with 77% saying that they would definitely recommend it.

David Ehrlich of IndieWire called the film an "orgiastic work of slaphappy genius", praising the direction and performances, particularly Yeoh's. The Hollywood Reporters David Rooney called it a "frenetically plotted serve of stoner heaven [that] is insanely imaginative and often a lot of fun", complimenting the cast and score but found the handling of the story's underlying theme underwhelming. In her review for RogerEbert.com, Marya E. Gates lauded Yeoh's performance, writing, "Yeoh is the anchor of the film, given a role that showcases her wide range of talents, from her fine martial art skills to her superb comic timing to her ability to excavate endless depths of rich human emotion, often just from a glance or a reaction." Charles Bramesco, writing for The Guardian, praised Daniels for constructing a "large, elaborate, polished, and detailed expression of a vision," Amy Nicholson of The Wall Street Journal wrote, "Over its nearly two-and-a-half-hour running time, the movie's ambitions double, and double again, as though it's a petri dish teeming with Mr. Kwan and Mr. Scheinert's wildest ideas."

In her review for Vanity Fair, Maureen Ryan highlighted Yeoh's performance, writing, "Yeoh imbues Evelyn with moving shades of melancholy, regret, resolve, and growing curiosity" and adding that she "makes her embrace of lead-character energy positively gripping." Adam Nayman of The Ringer referred to the film as "a love letter to Yeoh [and] extremely poignant, giving its 59-year-old star a chance to flex unexpected acting muscles while revisiting the high-flying fight choreography that made her a global icon back in the 1990s". In his review for the Chicago Sun-Times, Jake Coyle wrote that although it "can verge on overload, it's this liberating sense of limitless possibility that the movie leaves you filled with, both in its freewheeling anything-goes playfulness and in its surprisingly tender portrait of existential despair". Tasha Robinson of Polygon named the scene of Evelyn and Joy Wang as rocks with their dialogue appearing as on-screen subtitles, all while trying to find common ground, as one of the best movie scenes of 2022, saying "...it's a perfect moment. Like so many EEAAO sequences, it turns between emotions on a dime. But the quiet of the moment is essential. Out of context, it's just an odd moment between rocks. But within the context of the film, it's a breather the audience and characters both desperately need, and the emotions are so heightened that just the sight of rock-Joy and rock-Evelyn sharing a companionable laugh is remarkably heartening and hilarious."

Dissenting reviews include that of Richard Brody for The New Yorker, who dismissed it as a "sickly cynical feature-length directorial pitch reel for a Marvel movie", and that of Peter Bradshaw for The Guardian who described it as "a formless splurge of Nothing Nowhere Over a Long Period of Time".

The New York Times named the character Jobu Tupaki, played by Hsu, one of the 93 Most Stylish "People" of 2022.

Accolades

Prior to the Oscar ceremony, IGN reported that Everything Everywhere All at Once had already surpassed The Lord of The Rings: The Return of the King as "the most awarded film of all time." It won seven of its 11 Academy Award nominations: Best Picture, Best Director, Best Actress (for Yeoh),  Best Supporting Actor (for Kwan), Best Supporting Actress (for Curtis), Best Original Screenplay and Best Editing. The film received 10 British Academy Film Awards nominations (winning one), 13 Critics' Choice Movie Awards nominations (winning five), eight Independent Spirit Awards nominations (winning a record-breaking seven), and six Golden Globe Awards (winning two). It was named one of the top 10 films of 2022 by the National Board of Review and the American Film Institute. The film also won top prizes from Directors Guild of America Awards, Producers Guild of America Awards, Writers Guild of America Awards, and Screen Actors Guild Awards (where it won a record-breaking four awards).

Everything Everywhere All at Once made Academy Awards history with nominations across multiple categories. Yeoh is the first Asian woman to win Best Actress, as well as the second woman of color overall after Halle Berry in 2002. Stephanie Hsu's nomination in the Best Supporting Actress category, alongside Hong Chau's nomination for The Whale, marked the first time two Asian actresses were nominated in that category in the same year. It is also the first science-fiction film to win Best Picture, and to win five of the top six Academy Awards. While no film has won in all four acting categories, it became only the third to win three out of four, along with A Streetcar Named Desire (1951) and Network (1976), and the first to also win Best Picture.

See also
 Asian Americans in arts and entertainment

References

External links

 
 

2020s action comedy-drama films
2020s American films
2020s Cantonese-language films
2020s English-language films
2020s Mandarin-language films
2020s martial arts comedy films
2020s science fiction comedy-drama films
2022 action comedy films
2022 black comedy films
2022 independent films
2022 LGBT-related films
2022 science fiction films
A24 (company) films
Absurdist fiction
Alternate timeline films
American action comedy-drama films
American black comedy films
American films with live action and animation
American martial arts comedy films
American science fiction comedy-drama films
Best Picture Academy Award winners
Censored films
Chinese New Year films
Comedy films about Asian Americans
Existentialist films
Films about immigration to the United States
Films about mother–daughter relationships
Films about parallel universes
Films about parenting
Films featuring a Best Actress Academy Award-winning performance
Films featuring a Best Musical or Comedy Actress Golden Globe winning performance
Films featuring a Best Supporting Actor Academy Award-winning performance
Films featuring a Best Supporting Actor Golden Globe winning performance
Films featuring a Best Supporting Actress Academy Award-winning performance
Films set in California
Films set in offices
Films shot in Los Angeles
Films whose director won the Best Directing Academy Award
Films whose editor won the Best Film Editing Academy Award
Films whose writer won the Best Original Screenplay Academy Award
Judaism-related controversies
Lesbian-related films
LGBT-related black comedy films
LGBT-related films about Chinese Americans
LGBT-related science fiction comedy-drama films
Magic realism films
Metafictional works
Metaphysical fiction films
Midlife crisis films
Philosophical fiction
Surreal comedy films
Surrealist films
Works about existentialism